Sandesh Assembly constituency is one of 243 assembly seats of the Bihar Legislative Assembly. It is part of  Arrah Lok Sabha constituency along with other assembly constituencies viz Barhara, Arrah, Agiaon (SC), Tarari, Jagdishpur and Shahpur.

Area/ Wards
Sandesh Assembly constituency comprises:

 Sandesh CD block 
 Udwantnagar CD block
 Gram Panchayats: Sakaddi, Kulharia, Dhandiha, Bhadwar, Narbirpur, Khangaon, Gopalpur, Jalpura Tapa, Jokta and Koilwar (Nagar panchayat) of Koilwar CD block.

Members of the Legislative Assembly
The Sandesh Assembly constituency was created in 1957. The list of the Members of the Legislative Assembly (MLA) representing Sandesh constituency is as follows:

Election results

2020

See also
 List of Assembly constituencies of Bihar

Sources
Bihar Assembly Election Results in 1951
Bihar Assembly Election Results in 1957
Bihar Assembly Election Results in 1962
Bihar Assembly Election Results in 1967
Bihar Assembly Election Results in 1969
Bihar Assembly Election Results in 1972
Bihar Assembly Election Results in 1977
Bihar Assembly Election Results in 1980
Bihar Assembly Election Results in 1985
Bihar Assembly Election Results in 1990
Bihar Assembly Election Results in 1995
Bihar Assembly Election Results in 2000
Bihar Assembly Election Results in 2005
Bihar Assembly Election Results in 2010

References

External links
 

Politics of Bhojpur district, India
Assembly constituencies of Bihar